The Joglland is a heavily forested low mountain region in northeastern Styria in the districts of Hartberg-Fürstenfeld and Weiz. Today it forms the tourist region of Joglland–Waldheimat (Kraftspendedörfer Joglland).

Its name is probably derived from Jakob (perhaps from the village of Sankt Jakob im Walde) which, in this region is often corrupted to Joggl or Jackl. The region is described in the literature by the Styrian poet, Peter Rosegger, who grew up as a farmer's son in Alpl.

Location and landscape 

The Joglland lies within East Styria between the Wechsel, the upper Feistritz valley, the Safenbach and the area of Hartberg-Friedberg. It forms a sub-group of the Prealps East of the Mur.

To the north lies the Semmering region, to the northeast is the region known as the Bucklige Welt. To the northwest are the Fischbach Alps, and beyond them the lower Mürz valley. To the west and southwest are the Graz Highlands. To the south are the East Styrian Hills, and to the southeast is South Burgenland – The latter already forming part of the Southeast Alpine Foreland, facing the Pannonian Plain.

The highest points of this region, with its Mittelgebirge character are the summits of the Wechsel massif – such as the Hochwechsel (1,742 m), Herrenstein (1,448 m) and Hochkogel (1,314 m) – the Wildwiesen (1,254 m), the Masenberg (1,261 m) and the Rabenwaldkogel (1,281 m).

The region is drained by the Feistritz and Lafnitz rivers.

References

External links 

 http://www.joglland-waldheimat.at

Regions of Austria
Prealps East of the Mur
Mountain ranges of Styria
Mountain ranges of the Alps
Forests and woodlands of Austria